Hurricane Alex was the first Atlantic hurricane to occur in January since Hurricane Alice of 1954–1955. Alex originated as a non-tropical low near the Bahamas on January 7, 2016. Initially traveling northeast, the system passed by Bermuda on January8 before turning southeast and deepening. It briefly acquired hurricane-force winds by January 10, then weakened slightly before curving towards the east and later northeast. Acquiring more tropical weather characteristics over time, the system transitioned into a subtropical cyclone well south of the Azores on January 12, becoming the first North Atlantic tropical or subtropical cyclone in January since Tropical Storm Zeta of 2005–2006. Alex continued to develop tropical features while turning north-northeast, and transitioned into a fully tropical cyclone on January 14. The cyclone peaked in strength as a Category1 hurricane on the Saffir–Simpson scale (SSHWS), with maximum sustained winds of 85mph (140km/h) and a central pressure of 981mbar (hPa; 28.97inHg). Alex weakened to a high-end tropical storm before making landfall on Terceira Island on January 15. By that time, the storm was losing its tropical characteristics; it fully transitioned back into a non-tropical cyclone several hours after moving away from the Azores. Alex ultimately merged with another cyclone over the Labrador Sea on January 17.

The precursor cyclone to Hurricane Alex brought stormy conditions to Bermuda from January7 to 9. On its approach, the hurricane prompted hurricane and tropical storm warnings and the closure of schools and businesses for the Azores. Alex brought gusty winds and heavy rain to the archipelago, though structural damage was generally minor. One person died of a heart attack because the inclement weather prevented them from being transported to hospital in time.

Background and records

As currently defined, the Atlantic hurricane season lasts from June1 to November 30, the period in which tropical cyclones are most likely to develop across the basin. Occasionally, systems develop outside these seasons, most frequently in May or December. Activity in January is extremely rare; only five systems other than Alex have been recorded since 1851: an unnamed hurricane in 1938, an unnamed tropical storm in 1951, Hurricane Alice in 1954–55, an unnamed subtropical storm in 1978, and Tropical Storm Zeta in 2005–06. Because Alice formed in December 1954 and persisted into January 1955, Alex is only the second hurricane after the unnamed storm of 1938 to originate within January.

Alex's landfall on Terceira as a strong tropical storm marked only the second such occurrence for an Atlantic tropical cyclone in Januaryafter Hurricane Alice of 1955, which made landfall on the islands of Saint Martin and Saba. Equally unseasonable at the time of its formation was its location: Alex became only the second hurricane on record to form north of 30°N and east of 30°W. Alex was the first hurricane to impact the Azores since Hurricane Gordon in 2012, and the only recorded hurricane to track within 230mi (370km) of the Azores outside the usual activity period between August and September.

Unrelated to Alex, the formation of Hurricane Pali over the Central Pacific in early January coincided with Alex's development over the Atlantic. This marked the first occurrence of simultaneous January tropical cyclones between these two basins.

Meteorological history

In early January 2016, a stationary front spanned across the western Caribbean, spawning a non-tropical low along its boundary over northwestern Cuba by January6. The low moved northeast ahead of the subtropical jet stream the following day, when its interaction with a shortwave trough produced a cyclonic disturbance at the lower atmospheric levels northeast of the Bahamas. This system proceeded northeast toward Bermuda, where unfavorable atmospheric conditions such as strong wind shear, low sea surface temperatures, and dry air initially inhibited tropical or subtropical cyclone formation. The system featured a large field of gale-force winds, with maximum sustained winds of 60–65mph (95–100km/h). On January 8, it passed about 75mi (120 km) north of Bermuda, bringing strong winds and heavy rain to the islands. The next day, an unseasonable air pattern blocked the disturbance from continuing along its northeasterly path. Instead, the system turned east-southeast into a region slightly more favorable for subtropical development. On January 10, surface pressures below the system's core deepened to 979mbar (hPa; 28.91inHg) as the surrounding winds reached hurricane-force. Concurrently, a warm-core seclusion at the upper-levels marked the transition to a more symmetric structure, although convective activity near the center remained sparse.

The system underwent substantial changes to its cyclonic structure on January 11–12: frontal boundaries separated from the core of the cyclone, its core became symmetric, it became co-located with an upper-level low, and intense albeit shallow convection developed atop the circulation. All these factors indicated the storm's transition into a subtropical cyclone by 18:00UTC on January 12, at which point it was situated 1,150mi (1,850km) west-southwest of the Canary Islands and received the name Alex from the National Hurricane Center. The cyclone proceeded to the east-northeast and eventually north-northeast over the next day, steered by the same trough that had enabled the previous southward turn.

An eye feature soon appeared at the center of the cyclone's spiral bands, marking intensification. The 20mi-wide (25km) feature cleared out early on January 14 and was surrounded by a largely symmetric ring of  cloud tops. Alex then began to move away from the upper-level low it had been situated under and entered a region of lower wind shear, allowing the cyclone to acquire a deeper warm core with upper-level outflow typical of more tropical systems. Despite moving over  waters, Alex continued to deepen and became a fully tropical cyclone by 06:00UTC on January 14a transition supported by greater instability than usual for tropical cyclones due to colder upper-tropospheric temperatures than those around the equator. Upon the storm's transition, Dvorak satellite estimates indicated that Alex had achieved hurricane strength. The hurricane achieved its peak intensity as a tropical cyclone with winds of 85mph (140km/h) and a minimum barometric pressure of 981mbar (hPa; 28.97inHg) soon thereafter, classifying as a Category1 on the Saffir–Simpson scale.

As Alex moved north toward the Azores, decreasing sea surface temperatures and increasing wind shear caused the cyclone to weaken through January 14 and 15. A deterioration of the convection around the hurricane's eye feature marked the start of its transition back to an extratropical cyclone. Becoming increasingly disorganized due to shear, Alex weakened to a tropical storm before making landfall over Terceira Island at 13:15UTC with winds of 65mph (100km/h). Less than five hours later, the system completed its transition into an extratropical cyclone, featuring a more elongated circulation, an expanding radius of maximum winds, and frontal boundaries. Furthermore, the overall structure became more "comma-shaped" as a consequence of the frontal systems. The system deepened slightly to 978mbar (hPa; 28.88inHg) as it turned northwest towards Greenland. On its passage, the cyclone interacted with the mountainous southeastern coast of the island, generating hurricane-force winds over that region. Around 06:00UTC on January 17, the remnants of Alex were absorbed into a larger extratropical low over the North Atlantic.

Preparations and impact

Bermuda
The precursor to Alex brought stormy conditions to Bermuda between January7 and 9, dropping  of rain at Bermuda International Airport over the course of these three days. Gusts to  disrupted air travel, downed trees, and left 753 customers without power on January8. Waves as high as  prompted small craft advisories and the suspension of ferry services between the islands.

Azores
When Alex was classified as a hurricane on January 14, the Azores Meteorological Service issued a hurricane warning for the islands of Faial, Pico, São Jorge, Graciosa, and Terceira, and a tropical storm warning for São Miguel and Santa Maria. A red alertthe highest level of weather warningswas declared for central and eastern islands. Anticipating strong winds and heavy rain, homeowners stacked sandbags to protect their properties from flooding and boarded up doors and windows. Officials closed schools and administrative buildings for the duration of the storm. SATA Air Açores cancelled 33 domestic and international flights for the morning of January 15, stranding more than 700 passengers. The hurricane and tropical storm warnings were discontinued on January 15 after Alex had passed.

Traversing the archipelago on January 15, Alex brought heavy rain and gusty winds to several islands. The strong winds brought down trees, damaged some roofs, and triggered scattered power outages. The storm caused minor flooding; six homes in Ponta Delgada sustained damage, while the winds destroyed the roof of another. Landslides occurred across the central islands, though their damage was limited. Overall, the storm's effects were milder than initially feared, possibly because the strongest winds were located far from the center of Alex as the system underwent an extratropical transition. One person suffering a heart attack died as an indirect result of Alex when turbulence from the storm hindered their emergency helicopter from taking off in time.

See also

 Other storms of the same name
 List of off-season Atlantic hurricanes
 Tropical cyclones in 2016
 List of Bermuda hurricanes
 List of Azores hurricanes
 Hurricane Able (1951) – A rare pre-season May hurricane in 1951
 Hurricane Ophelia (2017) – A Category3 hurricane that attained that intensity farther east than any other storm on record

Notes

References

External links

 The NHC's archive on Hurricane Alex

2016 Atlantic hurricane season
Category 1 Atlantic hurricanes
Hurricanes in Bermuda
Hurricanes in the Azores
Off-season Atlantic tropical cyclones
January 2016 events
Alex